Megliore degli Abati was an Italian poet from 13th century Florence. He was a friend of the poet Guittone d'Arezzo. He is said to have been fluent in Provençal. He was considered to be one of the first poets who wrote in the vernacular.

References

13th-century Italian poets
Italian male poets
Writers from Florence